Boris Becker defeated the defending champion Stefan Edberg in the final, 6–0, 7–6(7–1), 6–4 to win the gentlemen's singles tennis title at the 1989 Wimbledon Championships.

The semifinal match between Ivan Lendl and Becker was (at the time) the longest ever Wimbledon semifinal, at four hours and one minute long. It was later surpassed by the 2013 encounter between Novak Djokovic and Juan Martín del Potro, which would last four hours and forty-three minutes.

John McEnroe reached the semifinals, his best showing at a major since reaching the 1985 US Open final.

Seeds

  Ivan Lendl (semifinals)
  Stefan Edberg (final)
  Boris Becker (champion)
  Mats Wilander (quarterfinals)
  John McEnroe (semifinals)
  Jakob Hlasek (first round)
  Miloslav Mečíř (third round)
  Tim Mayotte (quarterfinals)
  Michael Chang (fourth round)
  Jimmy Connors (second round)
  Brad Gilbert (first round)
  Kevin Curren (third round)
  Aaron Krickstein (fourth round)
  Andrei Chesnokov (first round)
  Mikael Pernfors (second round)
  Amos Mansdorf (fourth round)

Qualifying

Draw

Finals

Top half

Section 1

Section 2

Section 3

Section 4

Bottom half

Section 5

Section 6

Section 7

Section 8

References

External links

 1989 Wimbledon Championships – Men's draws and results at the International Tennis Federation

Men's Singles
Wimbledon Championship by year – Men's singles